
Next Star may refer to:

Music competition series
Next Star (Romanian TV series), a Romanian youth musical reality competition television series that debuted in 2013
Next Star (Swedish TV series), a 2008–2010 Swedish youth musical reality competition television series
Next Persian Star, an Iranian television show that aired on TV Persia 
The Next Star, a 2008–2014 Canadian youth musical reality competition television series that aired on YTV
HaKokhav HaBa or The Next Star (Israel), an Israeli interactive reality singing competition, broadcast on Israeli Channel 2
Are You The Next Big Star?, reality music competition to find two new solo musical talents, created and developed by GMA New Media, Inc.

Sports competition series
Football's Next Star, a 2010 British reality competition television series to discover young football talents that aired on Sky 1
Football's Next Star (Irish TV series), a 2012 Irish reality competition television series to discover young football talents that aired on RTÉ Two
Skating's Next Star, a 2006 American reality competition television series that aired on WE tv

Others
Next Action Star, American reality television program shown on NBC in June and July 2004
 Next Star, a player development initiative of Australia's National Basketball League

See also
 Nexstar (disambiguation)